Francisco de Ovanda, O.F.M. or Franciscus de Ovanda was a Roman Catholic prelate who was appointed Bishop of Trujillo (1577).

Biography
Francisco de Ovanda was ordained a priest in the Order of Friars Minor.
On 15 Apr 1577, after the sudden resignation of his predecessor, Alonso Guzmán y Talavera, he was appointed during the papacy of Pope Gregory XIII as Bishop of Trujillo.
He was never consecrated bishop.

References

External links and additional sources
 (for Chronology of Bishops) 
 (for Chronology of Bishops) 

16th-century Roman Catholic bishops in Peru
Bishops appointed by Pope Gregory XIII
Roman Catholic bishops of Trujillo